Niles is a village in Cook County, Illinois, United States, located in the townships of Maine and Niles, directly neighboring the City of Chicago's far northwest border. Per the 2020 census, the population was 30,912. The current mayor of Niles is George Alpogianis.

History

Joseph Curtis settled in what became Niles in  1827, and John Dewes followed in 1831. The settlement was originally called "Dutchman's Point", referring to German immigrants who followed, including John Plank of Hesse-Darmstadt (who sold whiskey to passing travelers and remaining Native Americans) and the Ebinger brothers of Stuttgart, as well as John Schadiger, Julius Perren, John-Jackson Ruland (d. 1880) and Revolutionary war soldier John Ketchum.

Many people of Native American ancestry lived in the area; Chief Blackhawk reportedly often smoked a peace pipe with Christian Ebinger. Article 4 of the Second Treaty of Prairie du Chien, signed on July 29, 1829 between the United States government and several chiefs of the Chippewa, Ottawa, and Potawatamie left particular tracts of land to individuals of mixed-Native American ancestry. Among them were Billy Caldwell, Victoria Pothier, and Jane Miranda. Land titled to these individuals eventually established part of the border of Niles. During the 1832 Black Hawk War, one band of Native Americans may have reached Billy Caldwell's property as part of an attempt to reclaim land lost to the United States. Hostilities ended in 1833, and most Native Americans immediately left, moving west of the Mississippi River

Niles and Niles Township founding

The Ebingers settled near Milwaukee and Touhy Avenues in the early 1830s. John Ebinger had been the head gardener for King William in Württemberg, Germany, but moved to the United States (initially Ann Arbor, Michigan) when he was 62. His eldest son Frederick had traveled to Chicago and worked on the pier or harbor by 1832, and was soon joined by his brother John Jr. and their wives, as well as John Plank. John Ebinger and his youngest son Christian (at 21 newly married to orphaned Barbara Reuhle of Stuttgart in 1834; both of whom walked the route to enable their elders to ride) packed and traveled to join them, but found Chicago too swampy to farm. The older Ebinger brothers (one of whom married the sister of Fort Dearborn's commanders' wife) soon joined them, as did the Planks. John Plank soon sold his house to Mr. Phillips, who opened a store and became the area's first postmaster. Christian Ebinger or his son of the same name (born 1835 and the first white child born in the area, d. 1879), became the first minister to be ordained in their German Evangelical Association, and served as the Village Collector, Township Assessor and Overseer of the Poor (from 1852 to 1865) and Highway Commissioner, as well as left seven surviving children.

There is no clear indication of the origin of the name "Niles." A Chicago Tribune article from 1929 opined that the name referred to the Niles Weekly Register, a popular newspaper published in the 1820s and 1830s by fervently nationalist (and abolitionist) Quaker Hezekiah Niles out of Baltimore, Maryland. His son William Ogden Niles published the newspaper from Washington, D.C. until it ceased publication in 1849; the Odgen family had longstanding connections with the Chicago area. Another belief is that the name "Niles" was named after Niles Construction which did much of the building early during the city's founding. Alternatively, soldiers from Niles, Michigan reinforced Fort Dearborn during the Black Hawk War, and afterward may have sent word back about the rich farmland to the north. Three early families of settlers came from Niles, Michigan with troops or had relatives at Fort Dearborn. An early history of Cook County, Illinois reported that every two weeks a half-breed Indian traveled to Niles, Michigan for mail. By 1834 a twice-weekly stage connected Chicago and Niles. The North Branch Hotel was built in 1837 and the White House tavern in 1847. By 1839, a traveling  German preacher visited Dutchman's Point every two or three weeks.

Niles Township was organized in a meeting at the North Branch Hotel on April 2, 1850, a year after John Odell donated land at Milwaukee and Harlem Avenues to build a second school (constructed by John Ketchem, who was active in the Methodist church) and four years after Joseph Curtis returned to England. Blacksmith Benjamin Lupton had returned to England to marry, then returned with his bride to Dutchman's Point in 1840, and remained the settlement's blacksmith for the next two decades. Residents later said the township name was chosen before the public meeting. The following year, the township adopted an ordinance to regulate livestock running amok. By 1858, Henry Harms had a store on Harms Avenue in Niles Center, the township's other population center, which was later renamed Skokie. By 1890, that area had six saloons, two blacksmith shops and three churches.

Post–World War II growth

Along with neighboring Skokie and several other suburbs, Niles is partly within Niles Township, from which it draws its name. The village of Niles was formally incorporated by the state of Illinois on August 24, 1899. The village had a population of 500 people at that time.
Niles, like neighboring communities Skokie, Park Ridge and Glenview, grew significantly after veterans of World War II and the Korean War returned home to the Chicago area and established families in the streetcar suburbs. In 1950, Niles had only 3,500 people, but as former farms and nurseries redeveloped into housing, the population tripled in the next five years, then nearly doubled, reaching 18,863 people in 1962. Unlike Park Ridge, Skokie and Glenview, Niles did not have its own commuter rail stop. Residents who did not use their own automobiles to reach their jobs could connect by bus to the Chicago Transit Authority stops at Jefferson Park or the Skokie Swift, or with the Chicago and Northwestern Commuter rail line (incorporated into Metra) in Park Ridge or Glenview or at intervening stops such as Norwood Park and Edison Park (once part of Niles Township until annexed by Chicago). Niles became the first community in Illinois, and one of the first in the United States to establish free ambulance service, in 1946. Several decades later, it instituted a free bus service to connect residents with local shops, government offices and transit options (shown).

In 1964, under then-new mayor Nicholas B. Blase, Niles was named an "All America City". Niles grew by selectively annexing nearby unincorporated areas of Cook County, the most important for tax revenue purposes being the area that became the Golf Mill Shopping Center. Its population peaked in 1970 at 31,432 people. Blase, the son of Greek immigrants raised in Chicago's Bridgeport neighborhood and a law and business graduate of University of Notre Dame, had moved to Niles in 1959 and initially worked as a claims adjuster for Allstate Insurance Company. He would become Niles' longest-serving mayor, but resigned in a scandal in 2008 which led to his federal criminal conviction for steering insurance business to cronies. Ironically, Blase was first elected in 1961, when he upset Frank Stankowicz, a former motorcycle cop who had won election first as village clerk, then had won election and re-election as mayor for two decades before passing the gavel to the young upstart. Blase's "New Era Party" ran a door-to-door campaign against corruption (police turning a blind eye to local gambling houses, and prostitution flourishing near the Chicago border) and builder favoritism. During his nearly five decades as mayor, Blase established a free bus service, a new village hall, a senior and fitness center, and a new police station, as well as jobs for nearly 500 municipal employees. Blase resigned in 2008 amid federal charges that he participated in an insurance kickback scheme. Several months later he pleaded guilty to mail fraud and tax evasion, and admitted that he had pressured local businesses to buy insurance from a friend's agency in return for a share of the commissions, receiving more than $420,000 over a period of more than 30 years. In 2010 Blase, then 81 years old, was sentenced to a year and a day in prison. After serving his term – first in federal prison, then in a halfway house, and then in home confinement – he returned to live in Niles. In 2011, his name was removed from the plaza outside the village hall and post office. Blase died in 2019.

Geography
Niles is located at  (42.0277127, -87.8100990).

Niles is adjacent to Chicago to the south, Skokie to the east, Morton Grove to the northeast, Glenview to the north, and Park Ridge and unincorporated Cook County (and portions of Chicago) to the west.

The town is centered along Milwaukee Avenue which forms a main artery diagonally through the town on a northwest–southeast bearing.

The North Branch of the Chicago River flows through the eastern part of the town roughly in a north-to-south direction.

Government and services
The Mayor of Niles is George D. Alpogianis, elected to the office in 2021 after previously serving as a trustee since 2013. Current trustees of the Village are John C. Jekot, Joe LoVerde, Danette O'Donovan Matyas, Denise M. McCreery, Craig Niedermaier and Dean Strzelecki.

Human Services
The Village of Niles operates several human services departments. These include Niles Family Services (counseling and social services), the Niles Senior Center, the Niles Teen Center and the Niles Family Fitness Center. In a 2016 advisory referendum, Village residents voted in favor of continuing to fund these human service divisions.

In 2011, the Niles Teen Center and Golf Mill Shopping Center were awarded a Gold U.S. Maxi Award by the International Council of Shopping Centers for their successful, on-going partnership. The Niles Teen Center was the recipient of the 2010 Bright Ideas initiative. Bright Ideas is an initiative that recognizes creative and promising government programs and partnerships. The initiative is offered through the Innovations in Government Program, a program of the Ash Center for Democratic Governance and Innovation at Harvard Kennedy School.

Police Department
The Niles Police Department provides 24-hour-a-day service and protection to village residents with 55 sworn officers, 36 auxiliaries, 2 Special Service Officers, 4 Operational Service Officers, 30 Community Service Officers, 10 civilians, and 17 school crossing guards. The Police Department is proactive in its efforts to enforce federal, state, and local laws through the utilization of numerous law enforcement strategies.

In 2018, the Niles Police Department created a new Community Policing Initiative, which assigned each officer to one of fourteen beats in an effort to increase familiarity and connection between residents and officers.

Fire Department
The Niles Fire Department began providing service on February 19, 1912. In 1946, the Village began providing free ambulance services, predating all other Illinois communities. In 1962, the Niles Fire Department named its first full-time fire Chief George Pasek. Currently the department is an ISO 3 ranked department (since 1967).

The fire department provides the following services: fire prevention, fire suppression, fire investigation, emergency medical treatment and transport, special technical rescue response, hazardous material response, and public education. Current staff consist of 52 sworn personnel. The department operates two fire engines, two ambulances, one tower ladder/truck, and one command vehicle out of two stations.

Located in Fire Station 2 is the historic "Blue Boy," which is the first fire wagon in Niles. It was used as a hand-drawn unit from 1899 to 1909, and converted to horse-drawn service in 1910.

Demographics

As of the 2020 census there were 30,912 people, 11,065 households, and 7,180 families residing in the village. The racial makeup of the village was 67.23% White, 1.70% African American, 0.38% Native American, 19.65% Asian, 0.01% Pacific Islander, 5.00% from other races, and 6.03% from two or more races. Hispanic or Latino of any race were 11.15% of the population.

There were 11,065 households, out of which 40.47% had children under the age of 18 living with them, 51.56% were married couples living together, 9.59% had a female householder with no husband present, and 35.11% were non-families. 29.81% of all households were made up of individuals, and 20.14% had someone living alone who was 65 years of age or older. The average household size was 3.23 and the average family size was 2.52.

The village's age distribution consisted of 16.4% under the age of 18, 7.0% from 18 to 24, 23.7% from 25 to 44, 27.6% from 45 to 64, and 25.1% who were 65 years of age or older. The median age was 47.6 years. For every 100 females, there were 93.5 males. For every 100 females age 18 and over, there were 89.6 males.

The median income for a household in the village was $63,490, and the median income for a family was $85,270. Males had a median income of $43,231 versus $35,299 for females. The per capita income for the village was $33,692. About 6.9% of families and 9.2% of the population were below the poverty line, including 9.8% of those under age 18 and 11.8% of those age 65 or over.

Note: the US Census treats Hispanic/Latino as an ethnic category. This table excludes Latinos from the racial categories and assigns them to a separate category. Hispanics/Latinos can be of any race.

Economy
Companies based in Niles include Shure, Bradford Exchange, Hammacher Schlemmer, and MFRI.

According to the Village's 2019 Comprehensive Annual Financial Report, the top employers in the city are:

Education

Elementary school districts:
 East Maine School District 63
 Park Ridge-Niles School District 64
 Golf School District 67
 Niles Elementary School District 71
 Fairview School District 72
 The Niles Township District for Special Education 807 serves some residents in these districts.

High school districts:
 Maine Township High School District 207
• Maine East High School
• Maine South High School
 Niles Township Community High School District 219
• Niles North High School
• Niles West High School

Community College district:
 Oakton Community College

Catholic schools:
 St. John Brebeuf School is a Catholic parish school serving students from pre-school through 8th grade.
 Northridge Preparatory School is a Catholic independent private high school.
 Notre Dame College Prep is a Catholic high school sponsored by the Brothers of Holy Cross. 
Baptist schools:
 Logos Christian Academy is a Romania-Baptist school.

Until 1998 the Chicago Futabakai Japanese School was located in Niles. In 1998 it moved to Arlington Heights.

Transportation

Niles Free Bus
The Niles Free Bus is a courtesy bus system, which operates within the Village of Niles at no charge to riders. The Free Bus runs continually from 6:30 a.m. to 5:00 p.m. on weekdays, and from 9:30 a.m. to 4:30 p.m. on weekends. The buses stop at all major shopping centers, public facilities, and within a short distance of every residence.

Major highways
Major highways in Niles include:

US Highways
 US 14

Illinois Highways
 Route 21
 Route 43
 Route 58

Notable places

A notable landmark and point of pride among Niles' residents is the Leaning Tower of Niles, a smaller-scale replica of the Leaning Tower of Pisa. This landmark is seen in the opening Chicago-area montage of the film Wayne's World. The Niles Leaning Tower has also been featured in many national magazines, including Oprah's "O" Magazine in 2014. It is located next to the local YMCA (which is appropriately called the "Leaning Tower YMCA"). Several concerts covering a variety of musical forms are held here throughout the summer.

Another notable landmark is the Tam O'Shanter Golf Course, which is currently under the ownership of the Niles Park District. From 1941 to 1957, the course was host to the All American Open on the PGA Tour. In 1964 and 1965, the course hosted the Western Open.

St. Adalbert Cemetery, the largest in the Archdiocese of Chicago in terms of burials, is the resting place of German immigrant Fredrak Fraske (1872–1973), who was the last surviving veteran of the "Indian Wars". St. Adalbert's is also the location of the Halas Family mausoleum, and is the final resting place of George Halas, former head coach of the Chicago Bears.

The world headquarters of the Bradford Group, a major collectibles company, is located on Milwaukee Avenue.

St. John Brebeuf Catholic Church was the first Catholic parish in Niles.

Golf Mill Shopping Center opened in 1960 and is still the largest shopping center in Niles.

Niles Community Rain Garden created in 2008.

Notable people
Paul Cienniwa, harpsichordist, organist, and choral conductor
Rev. Juan Čobrda, bishop of the Lutheran church
Jill Erickson, bank robber
Art Frantz, umpire in Major League Baseball 
Jim Les, National Basketball Association player and college basketball head coach
Pete Sykaras, Olympic baseball player
Agnes Zawadzki, figure skater and two-time World Junior medalist

Recent events

2011-Named Best Place in U.S. to Raise Kids by Bloomberg's BusinessWeek

2011- Gold U.S. Maxi Award (Teen Center)

2011   -Named "America's Best, Affordable Place to Raise Kids" by Businessweek.com. Businessweek studied the lifestyle parameters of 5,418 communities across the country, focusing on good schools, low taxes, safe neighborhoods and affordability of housing.

2010- Bright Ideas Initiative Award (Teen Center)

2003- Clean Air Counts Award Winner

Public Works Project of the Year by APWA Suburban Branch- Chicago Chapter

Sister cities
Niles has four sister cities as of 2008:
  Pisa, Italy (since 1991)
  Nafplion, Greece (since 1994)
  Leixlip, Ireland (since 2000)
  Limanowa, Poland (since 2005)

See also

 List of towns and villages in Illinois

References

External links
 Village of Niles official website

 
Populated places established in 1827
Chicago metropolitan area
Villages in Illinois
Villages in Cook County, Illinois
1827 establishments in Illinois